Plagiobothrys shastensis is an uncommon species of flowering plant in the borage family known by the common name Shasta popcornflower. It is native to southern Oregon and northern California, where it grows in grassland, woodland, and other types of habitat. It is an annual herb growing erect to about 30 centimeters in maximum height. It is coated in hairs. The leaves are located in a basal rosette with a few arranged alternately along the stem. The inflorescence is a straight branch holding paired flowers, rarely coiling at the tip as many other Plagiobothrys do. Each tiny white flower has a five-lobed corolla no more than 3 millimeters wide. The fruit is a cross-shaped nutlet 2 or 3 millimeters wide divided in half by a rough scar.

External links
Jepson Manual Treatment
Photo gallery

shastensis
Flora of California
Flora of Oregon
Flora without expected TNC conservation status